Sabha Airbase (also called Tamanhent Airbase) is a Libyan Air Force base southeast of Sabha, Libya.

The airport shares its runway with Sabha Airport.

History 
It used to support the Tupolev Tu-22 bomber, these have been non-operational since at least 1992.

Current use

Military 
The base is home to the 1st and 1025th Squadrons of Mikoyan-Gurevich MiG-25 fighter aircraft.

It was bombed by coalition aircraft during the 2011 Libyan civil war.

Expansion 
Google Earth shows the construction of 36 aircraft revetments in the South East corner.

MiG-25 fighter jets on the large rectangular tarmac in the south-west quadrant of the base.

Civilian 
Libyan Airlines currently serve the airport.

References 

Libyan Air Force bases
Airports in Libya
Airbase